Kimberly-Clark Corporation is an American multinational personal care corporation that produces mostly paper-based consumer products. The company manufactures sanitary paper products and surgical & medical instruments. Kimberly-Clark brand name products include Kleenex facial tissue, Kotex feminine hygiene products, Cottonelle, Scott and Andrex toilet paper, Wypall utility wipes, KimWipes scientific cleaning wipes and Huggies disposable diapers and baby wipes.

Founded in Neenah, Wisconsin, in 1872 and based in the Las Colinas section of Irving, Texas, since 1985, the company operated its own paper mills around the world for decades, but closed the last of those in 2012. With recent annual revenues topping $18 billion per year, Kimberly-Clark is regularly listed among the Fortune 500.

As of March 2020, the company had approximately 40,000 employees.

History

Kimberly, Clark and Co. was founded in 1872 by John A. Kimberly, Havilah Babcock, Charles B. Clark and Franklyn C. Shattuck in Neenah, Wisconsin, with $42,000 of capital. The group's first business was operating paper mills, which the collective expanded throughout the following decades. In 1888, the fledgling company faced a significant setback when its groundwood "Atlas" paper mill burned. Through an extensive effort by labor and management, within five months the mill was rebuilt and in production at a greater capacity. In that same year the company began rapid expansion, purchasing land in a town then known as The Cedars for a new groundwood pulp plant designed by prominent paper mill architects D. H. & A. B. Tower. In 1889, the town was renamed Kimberly after John A. Kimberly. The company would also contract the firm to expand its vast sulphite pulp complex in Appleton, Wisconsin, which allowed it to become the first firm west of Pennsylvania to adopt this improved manufacturing process. The company developed cellu-cotton in 1914, a cotton substitute used by the U.S. Army as surgical cotton during World War I. Army nurses used cellu-cotton pads as disposable sanitary napkins, and six years later the company introduced Kotex, the first disposable feminine hygiene product. Kleenex, a disposable handkerchief, followed in 1924. Kimberly & Clark joined with The New York Times Company in 1926 to build a newsprint mill in Kapuskasing, Ontario, Canada. Two years later, the company went public as Kimberly-Clark.

The firm expanded internationally during the 1950s, opening plants in Mexico, West Germany and the United Kingdom. It began operations in 17 more foreign locations in the 1960s. The company formed Midwest Express Airlines from its corporate flight department in 1984. Kimberly-Clark's headquarters moved from Neenah, Wisconsin to Irving, Texas the following year, although its products are still produced in Neenah. Alongside Cadbury, Kimberly-Clark withdrew advertising support for The Lou Grant Show in 1982, due to pressure from various conservative caucuses campaigning against star Ed Asner. Under the leadership of Darwin Smith as CEO from 1971 to 1991, the company was transformed from a business paper company to a consumer paper products company.

In 1991, Kimberly-Clark and The New York Times Company sold their jointly owned paper mill in Kapuskasing, Ontario. Kimberly-Clark entered a joint venture with Buenos Aires-based Descartables Argentinos S.A. to produce personal care products in Argentina in 1994 and also bought the feminine hygiene unit of VP-Schickedanz (Germany) for $123 million and a 90% stake in Handan Comfort and Beauty Group (China).

Kimberly-Clark bought Scott Paper in 1995 for $9.4 billion. In 1997, Kimberly-Clark sold its 50% stake in Canada's Scott Paper to forest products company Kruger Inc. and bought diaper operations in Spain and Portugal and disposable surgical masks maker Tecnol Medical Products. Augmenting its presence in Germany, Switzerland and Austria, in 1999 the company paid $365 million for the tissue business of Swiss-based Attisholz Holding. Expanding its offerings of medical products, the company bought Ballard Medical Products in 1999 for $774 million and examination-glove maker Safeskin in 2000 for about $800 million.

Also in 2000, the company bought virtually all of Taiwan's S-K Corporation; the move made Kimberly-Clark one of the largest manufacturers of packaged goods in Taiwan. The company later purchased Taiwan Scott Paper Corporation for about $40 million and merged the two companies, forming Kimberly-Clark Taiwan. In 2001, Kimberly-Clark bought Italian diaper maker Linostar and announced it was closing four Latin American manufacturing plants. 

In 2002, Kimberly-Clark purchased paper-packaging rival Amcor's stake in an Australian joint venture. In 2003, Kimberly-Clark added to its global consumer tissue business by acquiring the Polish tissue maker Klucze.

In early 2004, chairman and chief executive officer Thomas Falk began implementation of a global business plan that the company has detailed in July 2003. The firm combined its North American and European groups for personal care and consumer tissue under North Atlantic groups. In 2019, CEO Thomas Falk resigned his position but continued on as the company's chairman of the board. COO Michael D. Hsu became CEO following Falk's retirement.

In April 2020, the Financial Times reported that panic-buying during the COVID-19 pandemic led to a 13 percent increase in sales of Kimberley-Clark's consumer tissues in the first quarter of 2020 compared with the previous year. In April 2020, Kimberly Clark reported an eight percent decline in organic sales, its worst sales performance in at least a decade, according to the Wall Street Journal.

In 2022, Kimberly Clark acquired majority stake in Thinx, a period underwear brand.

Ownership
Kimberly-Clark shares are mainly held by institutional investors (Vanguard group, BlackRock, State Street Corporation and others).

Its subsidiaries include Kimberly-Clark Professional.

Relationship with Midwest Airlines
The origin of Midwest Airlines can be traced back to 1948, when Kimberly-Clark opened its corporate flight department and began providing air transportation for company executives and engineers between the company's headquarters in Neenah and its paper mills.

In 1969, K-C Aviation was born from the company's air operations, and was dedicated to the maintenance of corporate aircraft. In 1982, K-C Aviation initiated shuttle flights for Kimberly-Clark employees between Appleton, Memphis, and Atlanta. With this experience, and considering the Airline Deregulation Act of 1978, Kimberly-Clark and K-C Aviation formed a regularly scheduled passenger airline, Midwest Express Airlines, which was started on June 11, 1984. The name of the airline was shortened to Midwest Airlines in 2003.

K-C Aviation divested itself from the airline in 1996. Two years later, Gulfstream Aerospace purchased K-C Aviation from Kimberly-Clark for $250 million, which included its operations at airports in Dallas, Appleton, and Westfield, Massachusetts.

Major U.S. consumer product lines

Diapers and incontinence products
Huggies: diapers for infants and toddlers
Little Swimmers: swim diapers, marketed under the Huggies brand
Pull-Ups: training pants for toddlers undergoing toilet training, marketed under the Huggies brand
GoodNites (DryNites outside North America): pull-on diapers for children, teens and young adults who experience nocturnal enuresis (bedwetting), spun off from the Pull-Ups brand
Poise: Pads and liners for light to moderate urinary incontinence in adult women
Depend: diapers and briefs for adults

Feminine hygiene

Kotex
Kotex is a feminine hygiene product line that includes pantiliners, pads and tampons.

Tissues and wipes

Cottonelle
Cottonelle is a brand name for bath products. Product forms include premium bath tissue and flushable moist wipe products. On October 13, 2020, the Cottonelle brand flushable wipes issued a recall because the products manufactured between February through September may contain Pluralibacter gergovaie.

Kleenex
Kleenex is a brand name of facial tissue paper. Many versions have been made, including "with lotion, our softest ever!" and "regular". In the 1970s, color psychologist Dr. Cody Sweet represented newly styled Kleenex boxes as a national media spokesperson.

Scott

Scott is a brand name of paper napkins, paper towels and bath tissue/wipes.

Viva
Viva is a brand name of heavy-duty paper towels.

Mexican consumer product lines
The Mexican market has most of the American products as well as these products:

 Napkins: Kleenex, Petalo, Suavel, Delsey, Lys.
 Toilet paper: Kleenex, Petalo, Suavel, Delsey, Vogue, Lys.
 Diapers: KleenBebe, a brand similar to Huggies. The name is a combination of "kleen" (Kleenex) and "bebe" (Spanish for "baby").
 Professional and medical markets.

Major professional and global products

KimWipes

KimWipes are a type of cleaning tissue commonly used in laboratories. They are intended for applications in which leaving lint or fibers on a surface would be undesirable, such as on slides and pipettes. They are sometimes used to clean lenses, but use on optical lenses with special water- and solvent-based coatings may cause light blemishes, and the manufacturer recommends using a wipe specifically designed for use with coated lenses. KimWipes are composed of virgin wood pulp from certified forests, with few chemical additives, with utility beyond paper towels.

WypAll 
WypAll is a brand name for cleaning towels, wipes, and cloths. They are used in industrial settings and laboratories.

DryNites
DryNites are a version of GoodNites sold in Europe and Australasia.

See also
 Kimberly Crest
 Toilet paper in the United States

References

External links

 

 
Manufacturing companies established in 1872
American companies established in 1872
Companies listed on the New York Stock Exchange
Pulp and paper companies of the United States
Winnebago County, Wisconsin
1872 establishments in Wisconsin
1920s initial public offerings
Multinational companies headquartered in the United States
Personal care companies